Listed below are executive orders numbered 13198–13488, presidential memoranda, presidential proclamations, presidential determinations, and presidential notices signed by United States President George W. Bush.

Executive orders

2001

2002

2003

2004

2005

2006

2007

2008

2009

Presidential memoranda

Presidential determinations

Presidential proclamations

Presidential notices

2001

See also
 List of executive actions by Bill Clinton, EO #12834–13197 (1993–2001)
 List of executive actions by Barack Obama, EO #13489–13764 (2009–2017)

References

Notes

  National security directives are often classified and are not numbered among executive orders.
  National Security and Homeland Security Presidential Directives address continuity of government in the event of a "catastrophic emergency" disrupting the U.S. population, economy, environment, infrastructure and government policy.
  See: EO 13559, Nov 17, 2010.
  Amended by: EO 13498, Feb 5, 2009. See: EO 13559, Nov 17, 2010.
  Amends: EO 13035, Feb 11, 1997. See: EO 13092, Jul 24, 1998; EO 13113, Feb 10, 1999; EO 13215, May 31, 2001.
  Revokes: EO 12836, Feb 1, 1993 (in part). See: EO 12800, Apr 13, 1992. Revoked by: EO 13496, Jan 30, 2009.
  Revokes: EO 12871, Oct 1, 1993; Memorandum of Oct 28, 1999. See: EO 12983, Dec 21, 1995; EO 13156, May 17, 2000.
  Revokes: EO 12933, Oct 20, 1994. Revoked by: EO 13495, Jan 30, 2009.
  Revokes: EO 12924, Aug 19, 1994. See: EO 12002, Jul 7, 1977; EO 12214, May 2, 1980; EO 12938, Nov 14, 1994; EO 12981, Dec 5, 1995; EO 13026, Nov 15, 1996.
  Amends: EO 10000, Sep 16, 1948.
  Amends: EO 13202, Feb 17, 2001. Revoked by: EO 13502, Feb 6, 2009.
  Amends: EO 13183, Dec 23, 2000.
  Revoked by: EO 13316, Sep 17, 2003.
  Amended by: EO 13286, Feb 28, 2003; EO 13302, May 15, 2003. See: EO 13337, Apr 30, 2004.
  Amends: EO 13194, Jan 18, 2001. See: Notice of Jan 15, 2002; Notice of Jan 16, 2003; EO 13312, Jul 29, 2003. Revoked by: EO 13324,Jan 15, 2004.
  Amends: EO 13035, Feb 11, 1997. See: EO 13092, Jul 24, 1998; EO 13113, Feb 10, 1999; EO 13200, Feb 11, 2001.
  Amends: EO 13125, Jun 7, 1999.
  Amends: EO 13111, Jan 12, 1999. Revokes: EO 13174, Oct 27, 2000. See: EO 13316, Sep 17, 2003.
  Amended by: EO 13304, May 28, 2003. See: Notice of Jun 20, 2003; Notice of Jun 24, 2004; Notice of Jun 23, 2005; Notice of Jun 22, 2006; Notice of Jun 22, 2007; Notice of Jun 24, 2008; Notice of Jun 22, 2009; Notice of Jun 8, 2010.
  See: EO 12002, Jul 7, 1977; EO 12214, May 2, 1980; EO 12735, Nov 16, 1990; EO 12755, Mar 12, 1991; EO 12851, Jun 11, 1993; EO 13026, Nov 15, 1996; Notice of Aug 14, 2002 Notice of Aug 7, 2003; Notice of Aug 6, 2004; Notice of Aug 2, 2005; Memorandum of May 12, 2006; PD No. 2006-14 of May 18, 2006; Notice of Aug 3, 2006; Notice of Aug 15, 2007; Notice of Jul 23, 2008; Notice of Aug 13, 2009; Notice of Aug 12, 2010.
  Amended by: EO 13253, Jan 16, 2002; EO 13286, Feb 28, 2003. See: Proclamation 7463, Sep 14, 2001 (66 FR 48199); Notice of Sep 12, 2002 (67 FR 58317); Notice of Sep 10, 2003 (68 FR 53665); Notice of Sep 10, 2004 (69 FR 55313); Notice of Sep 8, 2005 (70 FR 54229).
  Amended by: EO 13268, Jul 2, 2002; EO 13284, Jan 23, 2003 EO 13372, Feb 16, 2005. See: Proclamation 7463, Sep 14, 2001 (66 FR 48199, Sep 18, 2001); Notice of Sep 19, 2002; Notice of Sep 18, 2003; EO 13338, May 11, 2004; Notice of Sep 21, 2004; Notice of Sep 21, 2005; Notice of Sep 21, 2006; Notice of Sep 20, 2007; Notice of Sep 18, 2008; Notice of Sep 21, 2009; Notice of Sep 16, 2010.
  Continues: EO 11183, Oct 3, 1964; EO 11145, Mar 7, .1964; EO 11287, Jun 28, 1966; EO 12131, May 4, 1979; EO 12196, Feb 26, 1980; EO 12216, Jun 18, 1980; EO 12345, Feb 2, 1982; EO 12367, Jun 15, 1982; EO 12382, Sep 13, 1982; EO 12900, Feb 22, 1994; EO 12905, Mar 25, 1994; EO 12994, Mar 21, 1996; EO 13021, Oct 19, 1996. Revokes: EO 13075, Feb 19, 1998; EO 13080, Apr 7, 1998; EO 13090, Jun 29, 1998; EO 13134, Aug 12, 1999 (in part); EO 13168, Sep 22, 2000. Supersedes: EO 13138, Sep 30, 1999 (in part). Superseded by: EO 13316, Sep 17, 2003.
  Revokes: EO 12882, Nov 23, 1993; EO 12907, Apr 14, 1994; EO 13138, Sep 30, 1999 (in part). Amended by: EO 13305, May 28, 2003; EO 13349, Jul 23, 2004; EO 13385, Sep 29, 2005. Continued by: EO 13446, Sep 28, 2007; EO 13511, Sep 29, 2009. Revoked by: EO 13539, Apr 21, 2010.
  Amended by: EO 13255, Feb 6, 2002. Revoked by: EO 13316, Sep 17, 2003.
  Amends: EO 12656, Nov 18, 1988. Amended by: EO 13284, Jan 23, 2003; EO 13286, Feb 28, 2003. See: EO 13231, Oct 16, 2001; EO 13257, Feb 13, 2002.
  Amends: EO 13045, Apr 21, 1997.
  Revokes: EO 12900, Feb 22, 1994.
  Revokes: EO 13130, Jul 14, 1999. Amended by: EO 13284, Jan 23, 2003; EO 13286, Feb 28, 2003; EO 13316, Sep 17, 2003; EO 13385, Sep 29, 2005; EO 13652, Sep 30, 2013. Continued by: EO 13446, Sep 28, 2007; EO 13511, Sep 29, 2009; EO 13652, Sep 30, 2013; EO 13708, Sep 30, 2015 See: EO 12333, Dec 4, 1981; EO 12382, Sep 13, 1982; EO 12472, Apr 3, 1984; EO 12958, Apr 17, 1995; EO 13228, Oct 8, 2001; EO 13585, Sep 30, 2011.
  Amends: EO 10789, Nov 14, 1958.
  Revokes: EO 12667, Jan 18, 1989. Revoked by: EO 13489, Jan 21, 2009.
  Federal Register page and date:66 FR 57355, Nov 15, 2001. Amended by: EO 13284, Jan 23, 2003.
  See: Notice of Sep 12, 2002 (67 FR 58317); Notice of Sep 10, 2003 (68 FR 53665); Notice of Sep 10, 2004 (69 FR 55313); Notice of Sep 8, 2005 (70 FR 54229).
  Amended by: EO 13316, Sep 17, 2003; EO 13385, Sep 29, 2005. Continued by: EO 13446, Sep 28, 2007. Superseded by: EO 13521, Nov 24, 2009.
  See: EO 11582, Feb 11, 1971.
  Revokes: EO 11957, Jan 13, 1977. Amended by: EO 13261, Mar 19, 2002. Revoked by: EO 13542, May 13, 2010.
  Revokes: EO 11880, Oct 2, 1975; EO 12608, Sep 9, 1987 (in part); EO 12998, Apr 5, 1996. Amended by: EO 13261, Mar 19, 2002.
  Revokes: EO 11274, Mar 30, 1966. Amended by: EO 13261, Mar 19, 2002.
  Revokes: EO 11487, Oct 6, 1969. Amended by: EO 13261, Mar 19, 2002.
  Revokes: EO 10513, Jan 19, 1954. Amended by: EO 13261, Mar 19, 2002.
  Revokes: EO 11822, Dec 10, 1974. Amended by: EO 13261, Mar 19, 2002.
  Amended by: EO 13261, Mar 19, 2002. See: Memorandum of Feb 12, 2003 (68 FR 10141).
  Supersedes: EO 13182, Dec 23, 2000.
  Amended by: EO 13261, Mar 19, 2002. Revoked by: EO 13261, Feb 15, 2008.
  Revokes: EO 12343, Jan 27, 1982. Amended by: EO 13261, Mar 19, 2002.
  Amends: EO 12171, Nov 19, 1979.
  Amended by: EO 13261, Sep 17, 2003; EO 13385, Sep 29, 2005. Continued by: EO 13446, Sep 28, 2007; EO 13511, Sep 29, 2009. Revoked by: EO 13532, Feb 26, 2010. Revokes: EO 12876, Nov 1, 1993.
  Amends: EO 13286, Feb 28, 2003. See: EO 13228, Oct 8, 2001. Amended by: EO 13333, Mar 18, 2004.
  Amends: EO 12866, Sep 30, 1993. Revoked by: EO 13497, Jan 30, 2009.
  Amends: EO 13241, Dec 18, 2001; EO 13242, Dec 18, 2001; EO 13243, Dec 18, 2001; EO 13244, Dec 18, 2001; EO 13245, Dec 18, 2001; EO 13251, Dec 28, 2001. Amended by: EO 13344, Jul 9, 2004.
  Amends: EO 12473, Apr 13, 1984. See: EO 13447, Sep 28, 2007.
  Revoked by: EO 13316, Sep 17, 2003. See: Proclamation 7804 of Jul 26, 2004.
  Amends: EO 13180, Dec 7, 2000.
  Amended by: EO 13316, Sep 17, 2003; EO 13385, Sep 29, 2005; EO 13545, Jun 22, 2010. Continued by: EO 13446, Sep 28, 2007; EO 13511, Sep 29, 2009; EO 13652, Sep 30, 2013; EO 13708, Sep 30, 2015. Revokes: EO 12345, Feb 2, 1982. See: EO 13585, Sep 30, 2011.
  Amends: EO 13224, Sep 23, 2001. See: EO 13129, Jul 4, 1999; EO 13371, Feb 16, 2005.
  Amended by: EO 13316, Sep 17, 2003; EO 13385, Sep 29, 2005. Continued by: EO 13446, Sep 28, 2007; EO 13511, Sep 29, 2009. Revokes: EO 13021, Oct 19, 1996. See:EO 13585, Sep 30, 2011; EO 13592, Dec 2, 2011
  Amended by: EO 13286, Feb 28, 2003. Terminated by: EO 13519, Nov 17, 2009.
  See: EO 12866, Sep 30, 1993.
  See: s:Executive Order 10173EO 10173, Oct 18, 1950.
  See: EO 12807, May 24, 1992. Amends: EO 13286, Feb 28, 2003.
  Amends: EO 11846, Mar 27, 1975. Amended by: EO 13346, Jul 8, 2004.
  Revoked by: EO 13316, Sep 17, 2003.
  Amends: EO 11246, Sep 24, 1965. Amended by: EO 13403, May 12, 2006; EO 13559, Nov 17, 2010.
  Superseded by: EO 13322, Dec 30, 2003.
  See: EO 12333, Dec 4, 1981. Revoked by: EO 13385, Sep 29, 2005.
  Amends: EO 10865, Feb 20, 1960; EO 11423, Aug 16, 1968; EO 11958, Jan 18, 1977; EO 12260, Dec 31, 1980; EO 12333, Dec 4, 1981; EO 12590, Mar 26, 1987; EO 12859, Aug 16, 1993; EO 12881, Nov 23, 1993; EO 12992, Mar 15, 1996; EO 13011, Jul 16, 1996; EO 13048, Jun 10, 1997; EO 13122, May 25, 1999; EO 13151, Apr 27, 2000; EO 13224, Sep 23, 2001; EO 13228, Oct 8, 2001; EO 13231, Oct 16, 2001; EO 13234, Nov 9, 2001. See: EO 12829, Jan 6, 1993; EO 12958, Apr 17, 1995; EO 12968, Aug 2, 1995; EO 13286, Feb 28, 2003; EO 13371, Feb 16, 2005.
  Amended by: EO 13371, Feb 16, 2005; EO 13424, Jan 26, 2007; EO 13471, Aug 28, 2008.
  Amended by: EO 13391, Nov 22, 2005. Superseded in part by: EO 13391, Nov 22, 2005. See: Notice of Mar 2, 2004; Notice of Mar 2, 2005; Notice of Feb 27, 2006; Notice of Feb 28, 2007; Notice of Mar 4, 2008; EO 13469, Jul 25, 2008; Notice of Mar 3, 2009; Notice of Mar 1, 2010.
  See: EO 10977, Dec 4, 1961; EO 12985, Jan 11, 1996; EO 13363, Nov 29, 2004; EO 13723, Mar 30, 2016.
  See: EO 13303, May 22, 2003; Notice of Jul 31, 2003 (68 FR 45739); Notice of May 19, 2005 (70 FR 29435). Amended by: EO 13350, Jul 29, 2004.
  Amends: EO 13282, Dec 31, 2002. See:EO 13322, Dec 30, 2003.
  Amends: EO 12958, Apr 17, 1995. Revoked by: EO 13526, Dec 29, 2009. See: EO 12356, Apr 6, 1982.
  Amends: EO 10448, Apr 22, 1953. See: EO 12776, Oct 8, 1991.
  Revokes: EO 11157, Jun 22, 1964; EO 11800, Aug 17, 1974.
  Revokes: EO 12452, Dec 22, 1983. Amended by: EO 13375, Apr 1, 2005.
  Amends: EO 13045, Apr 21, 1997.
  Revokes: EO 12865, Sep 26, 1993; EO 13069, Dec 12, 1997; EO 13098, Aug 18, 1998.
  Superseded by: EO 13537, Apr 14, 2010.
  Amends: EO 12863, Sep 13, 1993; EO 13070, Dec 15, 1997. See: EO 13376, Apr 13, 2005.
  Amends: EO 13212, May 18, 2001.
  Amended by: EO 13364, Nov 29, 2004 See: EO 12722, Aug 8, 1990; EO 12724, Aug 9, 1990; EO 13290, Mar 20, 2003; EO 13315, Aug 28, 2003; EO 13350, Jul 29, 2004; EO 13438, Jul 17, 2007; Notice of May 20, 2004; Notice of May 19, 2005; Notice of May 18, 2006; Notice of May 18, 2007; Notice of May 20, 2008; Notice of May 19, 2009; Notice of May 12, 2010; EO 13668,May 27, 2014.
  Amends: EO 13219, Jun 26, 2001. Revokes: EO 12808, May 30, 1992; EO 12810, Jun 5, 1992; EO 12831, Jan 15, 1993; EO 13088, Jun 9, 1998; EO 13121, Apr 30, 1999; EO 13192, Jan 17, 2001. See: Notice of Jun 20, 2003; Notice of Jun 24, 2004; Notice of Jun 23, 2005; Notice of Jun 22, 2006; Notice of Jun 22, 2007; Notice of Jun 24, 2008; Notice of Jun 22, 2009; Notice of Jun 8, 2010.
  Amends: EO 13035, Feb 11, 1997; EO 13226, Sep 30, 2001.
  Amends: EO 12580, Jan 23, 1987.
  Amends: EO 12994, Mar 21, 1996.
  Amends: EO 13047, May 20, 1997. See: EO 13448, Oct 18, 2007; EO 13464, Apr 30, 2008; Notice of May 17, 2004; Notice of May 17, 2005; Notice of May 18, 2006; Notice of May 17, 2007; Notice of May 16, 2008; Notice of May 14, 2009; Notice of May 13, 2010; EO 13619, Jul 11, 2012. Revoked by: EO 13742, Oct 7, 2016.
  Amended by: EO 13388, Oct 25, 2005. See: EO 12958, Apr 17, 1995; EO 12968, Aug 2, 1995; EO 13356, Aug 27, 2004.
  See: EO 13194, Jan 8, 2001; EO 13213, May 22, 2001.
  See: EO 13303, May 22, 2003; EO 13364, Nov 29, 2004; EO 13438, Jul 17, 2007; Notice of May 20, 2004; Notice of May 19, 2005; Notice of May 18, 2006; Notice of May 18, 2007; Notice of May 20, 2008; Notice of May 19, 2009; Notice of May 12, 2010; EO 13668, May 27, 2014. Superseded in part by: EO 13350, Jul 29, 2004.
  Amends: EO 12131, May 4, 1979. Revokes: EO 12975, Oct 3, 1995; EO 13147, Mar 7, 2000; EO 13210, May 2, 2001; EO 13214, May 28, 2001; EO 13227, Oct 2, 2001; EO 13263, Apr 29, 2002; EO 13278, Dec 11, 2002. Revokes in part: EO 13111, Jan 12, 1999; EO 13177, Dec 4, 2000. Continues: EO 11145, Mar 7, 1964; EO 11183, Oct 3, 1964; EO 11287, Jun 28, 1966; EO 12196, Feb 26, 1980; EO 12216, Jun 18, 1980; EO 12367, Jun 15, 1982; EO 12382, Sep 13, 1982; EO 12905, Mar 25, 1994; EO 13231, Oct 16, 2001; EO 13237, Nov 28, 2001; EO 13256, Feb 12, 2002; EO 13265, Jun 6, 2002; EO 13270, Jul 3, 2002. See: EO 13018, Sep 16, 1996; EO 13046, May 16, 1997; EO 13137, Sep 15, 1999; EO 13167, Sep 15, 2000; EO 13188, Jan 12, 2001; EO 13218, Jun 20, 2001; EO 13255, Feb 6, 2002. Supersedes: EO 13225, Sep 28, 2001. Superseded in part by: EO 13385, Sep 29, 2005.
  Amended by: EO 13418, Dec 14, 2006.
  Supersedes: EO 12364, May 24, 1982. Revoked by: EO 13562, Dec 27, 2010.
  Amends: EO 13183, Dec 23, 2000.
  See: EO 11582, Feb 11, 1971.
  See: EO 12396, Dec 9, 1982.
  Supersedes: EO 13282, Dec 31, 2002. See: EO 13291, Mar 21, 2003. Superseded by: EO 13332, Mar 3, 2004.
  Amends: EO 12293, Feb 23, 1981. Revoked by: EO 13374, Mar 14, 2005.
  Revoked by: EO 13385, Sep 29, 2005.
  Amended by: EO 13423, Jan 24, 2007; EO 13693, Mar 19, 2015. Revokes: EO 12512, Apr 29, 1985.
  Revoked by: EO 13385, Sep 29, 2005.
  See: EO 12958, Apr 17, 1995.
  See: Proclamation 7804 of Jul 26, 2004.
  Supersedes: EO 13322, Dec 30, 2003. Superseded by: EO 13368, Dec 30, 2004.
  See: EO 13351, Aug 9, 2004.
  See: EO 13175, Nov 6, 2000; EO 13592, Dec 2, 2011. Revokes: EO 13096, Aug 6, 1998.
   Amends: EO 11423, Aug 16, 1968. See: EO 10485, Sep 3, 1953; EO 10530, May 10, 1954; EO 13212, May 18, 2001.
  Amended by: EO 13460, Feb 13, 2008. See: EO 13224, Sep 23, 2001; Notice of May 5, 2005; EO 13399, Apr 25, 2006; Notice of May 8, 2006; Notice of May 8, 2007; Notice of May 7, 2008; Notice of May 7, 2009; Notice of May 3, 2010; EO 13572, Apr 29, 2011; EO 13573, May 18, 2011; EO 13582, Aug 17, 2011.
  Amended by: EO 13403, May 12, 2006. Superseded by: EO 13515, Oct 14, 2009.
  Amends EO11023, May 20, 2004.
  See: EO 11582, Feb 11, 1971.
  See: EO 11269, Feb 14, 1966. Revokes: EO 12757, Mar 19, 1991; EO 12823, Dec 3, 1992; EO 13028, Dec 3, 1996; EO 13131, Jul 22, 1999.
  Amends: EO 12163, Sep 29, 1979; EO 13277, Nov 19, 2002. See: EO 13419, Dec 20, 2006.
  See: Notice of Jul 19, 2005; Notice of Jul 18, 2006; Notice of Jul 19, 2007; Notice of Jul 16, 2008; Notice of Jul 16, 2009; Notice of Jul 19, 2010. Revoked by: EO 13710, Nov 12, 2015.
  Amends: EO 13326, Sep 30, 2001.
  Revokes: EO 12722, Aug 2, 1990; EO 12724, Aug 9, 1990; EO 12734, Nov 14, 1990; EO 12743, Jan 18, 1991; EO 12751, Feb 14, 1991; EO 12817, Oct 21, 1992. Amends: EO 13290, Mar 20, 2003. Supersedes in part: EO 13315, Aug 28, 2003. See: EO 13303, May 22, 2003; EO 13364, Nov 29, 2004; EO 13438, Jul 17, 2007; Notice of May 19, 2005; Notice of May 18, 2006; Notice of May 18, 2007; Notice of May 20, 2008; Notice of May 19, 2009; Notice of May 12, 2010.
  See: EO 13334, Apr 12, 2004.
  Revoked by: EO 13470, Jul 30, 2008, read in conjunction with EO 12333, Dec 4, 1981. See: EO 12333, Dec 12, 1981; EO 12958, Apr 17, 1995; EO 13470, Jul 30, 2008.
  See: EO 13470, Jul 30, 2008. Amends: EO 12333, Dec 12, 1981. Revoked by: EO 13470, Jul 30, 2008, read in conjunction with EO 12333, Dec 4, 1981.
  See: EO 12333, Dec 12, 1981; EO 12958, Apr 17, 1995; EO 13311, Jul 29, 2003. Revoked by: EO 13388, Oct 25, 2005.
  Revokes: EO 12538, Nov 15, 1985; EO 12543, Jan 7, 1986; EO 12544, Jan 8, 1986; EO 12801, Apr 15, 1992.
  Amends: EO 13173, Oct 25, 2000.
  Amends: EO 12163, Sep 29, 1979.
  Revoked by: EO 13442, Aug 13, 2007. See: EO 13286, Feb 28, 2003.
  See: EO 13289, Mar 12, 2003.
  Amends: EO 13303, May 22, 2003. See: EO 13315, Aug 28, 2003; EO 13350, Jul 29, 2004; EO 13438, Jul 17, 2007; Notice of May 19, 2005; Notice of May 18, 2006; Notice of May 18, 2007; Notice of May 20, 2008; Notice of May 19, 2009; Notice of May 12, 2010.
  Amends: EO 12473, Apr 13, 1984.
  Revoked by: EO 13547, Jul 19, 2010.
  Supersedes: EO 13332, Mar 3, 2004. Superseded by: EO 13393, Dec 22, 2005.
  Amended by: EO 13379, Jun 16, 2005; EO 13386, Sep 30, 2005. Revoked by: EO 13446, Sep 28, 2007.
  Amends: EO 13285, Jan 29, 2003.
  Amends: EO 11926, Jul 19, 1976. See: EO 13286, Feb 28, 2003.
  Amends: EO 12293, Feb 23, 1981. Revokes: EO 13325, Jan 23, 2004.
  Amends: EO 13295, Apr 4, 2003.
  Amends: EO 13295, Apr 4, 2003.
  Amends:EO 12863, Sep 13, 1993. See: EO 13070, Dec 15, 1997; EO 13301, May 14, 2003.
  Revokes: EO 11767, Feb 19, 1974.
  Amends: EO 12788, Jan 15, 1992.
  Amends: EO 13369, Jan 7, 2005. See: EO 13386, Sep 30, 2005; EO 13446, Sep 28, 2007.
  Amends: EO 13369, May 13, 1994.
  Amends: EO 12171, Nov 19, 1979. See: EO 12958, Apr 17, 1995. Amended by: EO 13403, May 12, 2006; EO 13408, Jun 29, 2006; EO 13436, Jun 28, 2007. Revoked by: EO 13467, Jun 30, 2008.
  Amends: EO 12938, Nov 14, 1994. See: EO 12735, Nov 16, 1990; EO 13094, Jul 28, 1998; Notice of Oct 25, 2005; Notice of Oct 27, 2006; Notice of Nov 8, 2007; Notice of Nov 10, 2008; Notice of Nov 6, 2009.
  Amends: EO 12139, May 23, 1979; EO 12949, Feb 9, 1995.
  Amends: EO 12216, Jun 18, 1980; EO 12367, Jun 15, 1982; EO 13226, Sep 30, 2001; EO 13231, Oct 16, 2001. Supersedes in part: EO 13316, Sep 17, 2003. Revokes: EO 13283, Jan 21, 2003; EO 13326, Jan 27, 2004; EO 13328, Feb 6, 2004. Continues: EO 11145, Mar 7, 1964; EO 11183, Oct 3, 1964; EO 11287, Jun 28, 1966; EO 12131, May 4, 1979; EO 12196, Feb 26, 1980; EO 12382, Sep 13, 1982; EO 12905, Mar 25, 1994; EO 12994, Mar 21, 1996; EO 13231, Oct 16, 2001; EO 13237, Nov 28, 2001; EO 13256, Feb 12, 2002; EO 13265, Jun 6, 2002; EO 13270, Jul 3, 2002. Superseded in part by: EO 13446, Sep 28, 2007.
  Amends: EO 13369, Jan 7, 2005. See: EO 13379, Jun 16, 2005; EO 13446, Sep 28, 2007.
  Amends: EO 12473, Apr 13, 1984. See: EO 12958, Apr 17, 1995.
  Revokes: EO 13356, Aug 27, 2004. Amends: EO 13311, Jul 29, 2003. See: EO 12958, Apr 17, 1995.
  Amended by: EO 13403, May 12, 2006; EO 13463, Apr 18, 2008.
  Amended by: EO 13463, Apr 18, 2008; EO 13504, Feb 19, 2009; EO 13512, Sep 29, 2009.
  Amends: EO 13288, Mar 6, 2003. Supersedes in part: EO 13288, Mar 6, 2003. See: Notice of Feb 27, 2006; Notice of Feb 28, 2007; Notice of Mar 4, 2008; EO 13469, Jul 25, 2008; Notice of Mar 3, 2009; Notice of Mar 1, 2010.
  Supersedes: EO 13368, Dec 30, 2004.
  Revoked by: EO 13533, Mar 1, 2010. Revokes: EO 13000, Apr 24, 1996; Memorandum of Jun 2, 2005.
  See: EO 13338, May 11, 2004; EO 13460, Feb 13, 2008; Notice of May 8, 2006; Notice of May 8, 2007; Notice of May 7, 2008; Notice of May 7, 2009; Notice of May 3, 2010; EO 13572, Apr 29, 2011; EO 13573, May 18, 2011; EO 13582, Aug 17, 2011.
  See: EO 13067, Nov 3, 1997; Notice of Nov 1, 2006; Notice of Nov 1, 2007; Notice of Oct 30, 2008; Notice of Oct 27, 2009.
  See: EO 12820, Nov 5, 1992.
  Amended by: EO 13414, Nov 3, 2006.
  Amends: EO 11030, Jun 19, 1962. Amends: EO 13279, Dec 12, 2002; EO 13339, May 13, 2004; EO 13381, Jun 27, 2005; EO 13389, Nov 1, 2005. Revokes: EO 13011, Jul 16, 1996.
  See: Notice of Jun 14, 2007; Notice of Jun 6, 2008; Notice of Jun 12, 2009; Notice of Jun 8, 2010.
  See: EO 12630, Mar 15, 1988.
  Amends: EO 12472, Apr 3, 1984.
  Amends: EO 13381, Jun 27, 2005.
  See: EO 13067, Nov 3, 1997; Notice of Nov 1, 2006; Notice of Nov 1, 2007; Notice of Oct 30, 2008; Notice of Oct 27, 2009.
  See: Notice of Oct 24, 2007; Notice of Oct 22, 2008; Notice of Oct 20, 2009. Amended by: EO 13671, Jul 8, 2014.
  Amends: EO 13402, May 10, 2006.
  Revokes in part: EO 12748, Feb 1, 1991; EO 12828, Jan 5, 1993.
  See: EO 12866, Sep 30, 1993.
  Amends: EO 13317, Sep 25, 2003.
  See: EO 1288, Nov 23, 1993; EO 13346, Jul 8, 2004; EO 13479, Nov 18, 2008.
  Supersedes: EO 13393, Dec 22, 2005. Superseded by: EO 13454, Jan 4, 2008.
  See: EO 11582, Feb 11, 1971.
  Amends: EO 12866, Sep 30, 1993. Revoked by: EO 13497, Jan 30, 2009.
  Amends: EO 13327, Feb 4, 2004. Revokes: EO 13101, Sep 14, 1998; EO 13123, Jun 3, 1999; EO 13134, Aug 12, 1999; EO 13148, Apr 21, 2000; EO 13149, Apr 21, 2000. See: EO 13432, May 14, 2007; EO 13514, Oct 5, 2009. Revoked by: EO 13693, Mar 25, 2015.
  Amends: EO 13285, Jan 29, 2003.
  Supersedes: Military Order of Nov 13, 2001.
  See: EO 7059-A, Jun 4, 1935; EO 10992, Feb 9, 1962.
  See: EO 13417, Dec 6, 2006.
  Amends: EO 12473, Apr 13, 1984.
  Amended by: EO 13693, Mar 19, 2015. See: EO 12866, Sep 30, 1993; EO 13423, Jan 24, 2007.
  Revoked by: EO 13505, Mar 9, 2009.
  Amends: EO 13381, Jun 27, 2005.
  See: EO 13303, May 22, 2003; EO 13315, Aug 28, 2003; EO 13350, Jul 29, 2004; EO 13364, Nov 29, 2004; Notice of May 20, 2008; Notice of May 19, 2009; Notice of May 12, 2010.
  See: Notice of Jul 30, 2008; Notice of Jul 30, 2009; Notice of Jul 29, 2010.
  Amends: EO 13286, Feb 28, 2003. Revokes: EO 13362, Nov 29, 2004.
  Amends: EO 12994, Mar 21, 1996. Continues: EO 11145, Mar 7,1964; EO 11183, Oct 3, 1964; EO 11287, Jun 28, 1966; EO 12131, May 4, 1979; EO 12196, Feb 26, 1980; EO 12216, Jun 19, 1980; EO 12367, Jun 15, 1982; EO 12382, Sep 13, 1982; EO 12905, Mar 25, 1994; EO 12994, Mar 21, 1996; EO 13226, Sep 30, 2001; EO 13231, Oct 16, 2001; EO 13237, Nov 28, 2001; EO 13256, Feb 12, 2002; EO 13265, Jun 6, 2002; EO 13270, Jul 3, 2002. Revokes: EO 13369, Jan 7, 2005. See: EO 13379, Jun 16, 2005; EO 13386, Sep 30, 2005. Supersedes in part: EO 13385, Sep 29, 2005. Superseded in part by: EO 13511, Sep 29, 2009.
  See: EO 12473, Apr 13, 1984; EO 13262, Apr 11, 2002.
  See: EO 13047, May 20, 1997; EO 13310, Jul 28, 2003; EO 13464, Apr 30, 2008; Notice of May 16, 2008; Notice of May 14, 2009; Notice of May 13, 2010; EO 13619, Jul 11, 2012. Amended by: EO 13619, Jul 11, 2012. Revoked by: EO 13742, Oct 7, 2016.
  See: Proclamation 5030, Mar 10, 1983.
  See: EO 11582, Feb 11, 1971.
  Supersedes: EO 13420, Dec 21, 2006. Superseded by: EO 13483, Dec 18, 2008.
  Amends: EO 11858, May 7, 1975. Revokes in part: EO 12919, Jun 3, 1994.
  Amends: EO 13338, May 11, 2004. See: EO 13399, Apr 25, 2006; Notice of May 7, 2008; Notice of May 7, 2009; Notice of May 3, 2010; EO 13572, Apr 29, 2011; EO 13573, May 18, 2011; EO 13582, Aug 17, 2011.
  Revokes: EO 13250, Dec 28, 2001; Memorandum of Mar 19, 2002.
  Amended by: EO 13516, Oct 28, 2009. Revokes: EO 12863, Sep 13, 1993. See: EO 12333, Dec 4, 1981; EO 12958, Apr 17, 1995; EO 12968, Aug 2, 1995; EO 13470, Jul 30, 2008.
  Amends: EO 13389, Nov 1, 2005; EO 13390, Nov 1, 2005.
  Amends: EO 12989, Feb 5, 1996.
  See: Notice of Jun 24, 2009; Notice of Jun 14, 2010; EO 13551, Aug 30, 2010; EO 13570, Apr 18, 2011; EO 13687, Jan 2, 2015; EO 13722, Mar 15, 2016.
  Amends: EO 12171, Nov 19, 1979; EO 12968, Aug 2, 1995. Amend by: EO 13741, Sep 29, 2016; EO 13764, Jan 17, 2017. Revokes: EO 13381, Jun 27, 2005. See: EO 10450, Apr 27, 1953; EO 10577, Nov 23, 1954; EO 10865, Feb 20, 1960; EO 12333, Dec 4, 1981; EO 12829, Jan 6, 1993; EO 12958, Apr 17, 1995; EO 13476, Oct 9, 2008; EO 13488, Jan 16, 2008; EO 13549, Aug 18, 2010.
  See: EO 12473, Apr 13, 1984.
  See: EO 13288, Mar 6, 2003; EO 13391, Nov 22, 2005; Notice of Mar 3, 2009; Notice of Mar 1, 2010.
  See: EO 12036, Jan 24, 1978; EO 12958, Apr 17, 1995; EO 13354, Aug 27, 2004; EO 13355, Aug 27, 2004; EO 13462, Feb 29, 2008. Amends: EO 12333, Dec 4, 1981. Revokes: EO 13354, Aug 27, 2004, and EO 13355, Aug 27, 2004, read in conjunction with EO 12333, Dec 4, 1981.
  Amends: EO 13285, Jan 29, 2003.
  See: EO 11030, Jun 15, 1962.
  Amends: EO 12962, Jun 7, 1995.
  Amends: EO 12139, May 23, 1979; EO 12949, Feb 9, 1995.
  See: EO 13467, Jun 30, 2008. Supersedes: EO 13176, Nov 27, 2000.
  Amends: EO 9397, Nov 22, 1943.
  See: EO 13419, Dec 20, 2006.
  Amends: EO 12171, Nov 19, 1979.
  Supersedes: Memorandum of Dec 8, 2006. Revoked by: EO 13557, Nov 4, 2010.
  See: EO 11582, Feb 11, 1971.
  Superseded by: EO 13525, Dec 23, 2009. Supersedes: EO 13454, Jan, 4, 2008.
  Amends: EO 13241, Dec 18, 2001.
  Supersedes: Memorandum of Mar 19, 2002.
  See: EO 10450, Apr 27, 1953; EO 13467, Jun 30, 2008. Amended by: EO 13764, Jan 17, 2017.
  In the Federal Register, German-American Day, 2002 is document number 02-25899, and Child Health Day, 2002 is document number 02-25898; however, in NARA, they are reversed for the archival link through GPO.
  Continues Proclamation 6867.
  Continues EO 12957.

Citations

Sources

External links
 Federal Archives
 Federal Register
 GPO's Federal Digital System (FDsys) - Bulk Data, Download multiple issues of the Federal Register or latest Code of Federal Regulations in XML.
 George W. Bush Presidential Center

 
United States federal policy
Executive orders of George W. Bush
George W. Bush-related lists